The Messerschmitt Me 262, nicknamed Schwalbe (German: "Swallow") in fighter versions, or Sturmvogel (German: "Storm Bird") in fighter-bomber versions, is a fighter aircraft and fighter-bomber that was designed and produced by the German aircraft manufacturer Messerschmitt. It was the world's first operational jet-powered fighter aircraft.

The design of what would become the Me 262 started in April 1939, before the Second World War. It made its maiden flight on 18 April 1941 with a piston engine, and its first jet-powered flight on 18 July 1942. Progress was delayed by problems with engines, metallurgy and interference from people including Hermann Göring, head of the Luftwaffe, and Adolf Hitler. The latter wanted the Me 262 to be a ground-attack/bomber aircraft rather than a defensive interceptor, thus necessitating a redesign. The aircraft became operational with the Luftwaffe in mid-1944. The Me 262 was faster and more heavily armed than any Allied fighter, including the British jet-powered Gloster Meteor. The Allies countered by attacking the aircraft on the ground and during takeoff and landing.

As one of the most advanced Second World War combat aircraft,  the Me 262 operated as a light bomber, reconnaissance, and experimental night fighter. The Me 262 proved to be an effective dogfighter against Allied fighters - German pilots claimed 542 Allied aircraft shot down, although higher claims have sometimes been made.
The aircraft had reliability problems because of strategic materials shortages and design compromises with its Junkers Jumo 004 axial-flow turbojet engines. Late-war Allied attacks on fuel supplies also reduced the aircraft’s effectiveness. Armament production within Germany was focused on more easily manufactured aircraft. Ultimately, the Me 262 had little effect on the course of the war because of its late introduction and the small numbers that entered service.

Although German use of the Me 262 ended with the close of the Second World War, a small number were operated by the Czechoslovak Air Force until 1951. Also, Israel may have used between two and eight Me 262s. These were supposedly built by Avia and supplied covertly, and there has been no official confirmations of their use.
It also heavily influenced several designs, such as the Sukhoi Su-9 (1946) and Nakajima Kikka. Many captured Me 262s were studied and flight-tested by the major powers, and influenced the designs of post-war aircraft such as the North American F-86 Sabre, MiG-15 and Boeing B-47 Stratojet. Several aircraft have survived on static display in museums. Some privately built flying reproductions have also been produced - these are usually powered by modern General Electric CJ610 engines.

Design and development

Origins
Several years prior to the Second World War, the Germans foresaw the great potential for aircraft powered by the jet engine constructed by Hans von Ohain in 1936. After the successful test flights of the world's first jet aircraft—the Heinkel He 178—within a week of the invasion of Poland which started the conflict, they adopted the jet engine for an advanced fighter aircraft. As a result, the Me 262 was already under development as Projekt 1065 (P.1065) before the start of the war. The project had originated with a request by the Reichsluftfahrtministerium (RLM, Ministry of Aviation) for a jet aircraft capable of one hour's endurance and a speed of at least . Woldemar Voigt headed the design team, with Messerschmitt's chief of development, Robert Lusser, overseeing.

During April 1939, initial plans were drawn up and, following their submission in June 1939, the original design was very different from the aircraft that eventually entered service. Specifically, it featured wing-root-mounted engines, rather than podded ones. The progression of the original design was delayed greatly by technical problems with the new jet engine. Because the engines were slow to arrive, Messerschmitt moved the engines from the wing roots to underwing pods, allowing them to be changed more readily if needed. That turned out to be important, both for availability and maintenance. Since the BMW 003 jets proved heavier than anticipated, the wing was swept slightly, by 18.5°, to accommodate a change in the center of gravity.

The jet engine program was waylaid by a lack of funding, which was primarily due to a prevailing attitude amongst high-ranking officials that the conflict could be won easily with conventional aircraft. Among these was Hermann Göring, head of the Luftwaffe, who cut the engine development program to just 35 engineers in February 1940 (the month before the first wooden mock-up was completed). The aeronautical engineer Willy Messerschmitt sought to maintain mass production of the piston-powered, 1935-origin Bf 109 and the projected Me 209. Major General Adolf Galland had supported Messerschmitt through the early development years, flying the Me 262 himself on 22 April 1943. By that time, the problems with engine development had slowed production of the aircraft considerably. One particularly acute problem was the lack of an alloy with a melting point high enough to endure the temperatures involved, a problem that had not been adequately resolved by the end of the war. After a November 1941 flight (with BMW 003s) ended in a double flameout, the aircraft made its first successful flight entirely on jet power on 18 July 1942, propelled by a pair of Jumo 004 engines.

Ludwig Bölkow was the principal aerodynamicist assigned to work on the design of the Me 262. He initially designed the wing using NACA airfoils modified with an elliptical nose section. Later in the design process, these were changed to AVL derivatives of NACA airfoils, the NACA 00011-0.825-35 being used at the root and the NACA 00009-1.1-40 at the tip. The elliptical nose derivatives of the NACA airfoils were used on the horizontal and vertical tail surfaces. To expedite construction, save weight, and use fewer strategic materials late in the war, the wing interiors were not painted.

During mid-1943, Adolf Hitler envisioned the Me 262 as a ground-attack/bomber aircraft rather than a defensive interceptor. The configuration of a high-speed, light-payload Schnellbomber ("fast bomber") was intended to penetrate enemy airspace during the expected Allied invasion of France. His edict resulted in the development of (and concentration on) the Sturmvogel variant. Hitler's interference helped to extend the delay in bringing the Schwalbe into operation; (other factors contributed too; in particular, there were engine vibration problems which needed attention). In his memoirs, Albert Speer, then Minister of Armaments and War Production, claimed Hitler originally had blocked mass production of the Me 262, before agreeing in early 1944. Similar criticisms were voiced by Lieutenant General Adolf Galland. Hitler rejected arguments that the aircraft would be more effective as a fighter against the Allied bombers destroying large parts of Germany and wanted it as a bomber for revenge attacks. According to Speer, Hitler felt its superior speed compared to other fighters of the era meant it could not be attacked, and so preferred it for high altitude straight flying.

The Me 262 is often referred to as a "swept wing" design as the production aircraft had a small, but significant leading edge sweep of 18.5° which likely provided an advantage by increasing the critical Mach number. Sweep, uncommon at the time, was added after the initial design of the aircraft. The engines proved heavier than originally expected, and the sweep was added primarily to position the center of lift properly relative to the center of mass. (The original 35° sweep, proposed by Adolf Busemann, was not adopted.) On 1 March 1940, instead of moving the wing backward on its mount, the outer wing was re-positioned slightly aft; the trailing edge of the midsection of the wing remained unswept. Based on data from the AVA Göttingen and wind tunnel results, the inboard section's leading edge (between the nacelle and wing root) was later swept to the same angle as the outer panels, from the "V6" sixth prototype onward throughout volume production.

Test flights
Testing showed that the Me 262 handled much better than previous fighters, such as the Bf 109 or Fw 190. Handling was so improved over the previous aircraft that a report by Major Ernst Englander stated that any Bf 109 pilot could convert to the Me 262 with only an hour of instruction. According to his report, even bomber pilots who converted to fly the Me 262 only required three instruction flights, and less than 5% had any difficulty retraining. The Me 262 had a gentle stall and gentle landing characteristics compared to previous German fighters. Its handling improved with speed and would lose much less speed during turning. It had a cruising speed of 465 mph, which was faster than the top speed of most other fighters of the day. It also had far better visibility in every direction compared to previous German fighters. Due to lack of engine torque, if a single engine was lost the aircraft remained easily controlled and landed without issue. Its only major deficiency was that brakes could not be used until the nose wheel had touched down, because engaging them before would smash the nose wheel strongly into the runway, potentially destroying the nose wheel and even the aircraft. The quality of the aircraft was high, with only 10% of aircraft returned for minor defects such as wings being out of alignment by under 1 degree. It could reach 515 mph without issue, although because it could reach extreme speeds in dives, components such as bomb racks would sometimes tear off.

Test flights began on 18 April 1941, with the Me 262 V1 example, bearing its Stammkennzeichen radio code letters of PC+UA, but since its intended BMW 003 turbojets were not ready for fitting, a conventional Junkers Jumo 210 engine was mounted in the V1 prototype's nose, driving a propeller, to test the Me 262 V1 airframe. When the BMW 003 engines were installed, the Jumo was retained for safety, which proved wise as both 003s failed during the first flight and the pilot had to land using the nose-mounted engine alone. The V1 through V4 prototype airframes all possessed what would become an uncharacteristic feature for most later jet aircraft designs, a fully retracting conventional gear setup with a retracting tailwheel—indeed, the very first prospective German "jet fighter" airframe design ever flown, the Heinkel He 280, used a retractable tricycle landing gear from its beginnings and flying on jet power alone as early as the end of March 1941.

The V3 third prototype airframe, with the code PC+UC, became a true jet when it flew on 18 July 1942 in Leipheim near Günzburg, Germany, piloted by test pilot Fritz Wendel. This was almost nine months ahead of the British Gloster Meteor's first flight on 5 March 1943. Its retracting conventional tail wheel gear (similar to other contemporary piston-powered propeller aircraft), a feature shared with the first four Me 262 V-series airframes, caused its jet exhaust to deflect off the runway, with the wing's turbulence negating the effects of the elevators, and the first takeoff attempt was cut short.

On the second attempt, Wendel solved the problem by tapping the aircraft's brakes at takeoff speed, lifting the horizontal tail out of the wing's turbulence. The first four prototypes (V1-V4) were built with the conventional gear configuration. Changing to a tricycle arrangement—a permanently fixed undercarriage on the fifth prototype (V5, code PC+UE), with the definitive fully retractable nosewheel gear on the V6 (with Stammkennzeichen code VI+AA, from a new code block) and subsequent aircraft corrected this problem.

Test flights continued over the next year, but engine problems continued to plague the project, the Jumo 004 being only marginally more reliable than the lower-thrust (7.83 kN/1,760 lbf) BMW 003. Early engines were so short-lived that they frequently needed replacement after only a single flight. Airframe modifications were complete by 1942 but, hampered by the lack of engines, serial production did not begin until 1944, and deliveries were low, with 28 Me 262s in June, 59 in July, but only 20 in August.

By mid-1943, the Jumo 004A engine had passed several 100-hour tests, with a time between overhauls of 50 hours being achieved. However, the Jumo 004A engine proved unsuitable for full-scale production because of its considerable weight and its high utilization of strategic material (Ni, Co, Mo), which were in short supply. Consequently, the 004B engine was designed to use a minimum amount of strategic materials. All high heat-resistant metal parts, including the combustion chamber, were changed to mild steel (SAE 1010) and were protected only against oxidation by aluminum coating. The total engine represented a design compromise to minimize the use of strategic materials and to simplify manufacture. With the lower-quality steels used in the 004B, the engine required overhaul after just 25 hours for a metallurgical test on the turbine. If it passed the test, the engine was refitted for a further 10 hours of usage, but 35 hours marked the absolute limit for the turbine wheel. While BMW's and Junkers' axial compressor turbojet engines were characterised by a sophisticated design that could offer a considerable advantage – also used in a generalized form for the contemporary American Westinghouse J30 turbojet – the lack of rare materials for the Jumo 004 design put it at a disadvantage compared to the "partly axial-flow" Power Jets W.2/700 turbojet engine which, despite its own largely centrifugal compressor-influenced design, provided (between an operating overhaul interval of 60–65 hours) an operational life span of 125 hours. Frank Whittle concludes in his final assessment over the two engines: "it was in the quality of high temperature materials that the difference between German and British engines was most marked"

Operationally, carrying  of fuel in two  tanks, one each fore and aft of the cockpit; and a  ventral fuselage tank beneath, the Me 262 would have a total flight endurance of 60 to 90 minutes. Fuel was usually J2 (derived from brown coal), with the option of diesel or a mixture of oil and high octane B4 aviation petrol. Fuel consumption was double the rate of typical twin-engine fighter aircraft of the era, which led to the installation of a low-fuel warning indicator in the cockpit that notified pilots when remaining fuel fell below .

To build one airframe took around 6,400-man-hours.

Operational history

Introduction
On 19 April 1944, Erprobungskommando 262 was formed at Lechfeld just south of Augsburg, as a test unit (Jäger Erprobungskommando Thierfelder, commanded by Hauptmann Werner Thierfelder) to introduce the Me 262 into service and train a corps of pilots to fly it. On 26 July 1944, Leutnant Alfred Schreiber with the 262 A-1a W.Nr. 130 017 damaged a Mosquito reconnaissance aircraft of No. 540 Squadron RAF PR Squadron, which was allegedly lost in a crash upon landing at an air base in Italy. Other sources state the aircraft was damaged during evasive manoeuvres and escaped.

Major Walter Nowotny was assigned as commander after the death of Thierfelder in July 1944, and the unit redesignated Kommando Nowotny. Essentially a trials and development unit, it mounted the world's first jet fighter operations. Trials progressed at a slow pace; it was not until August 1944 that initial operational missions were flown against the Allies; the unit made claims for 19 Allied aircraft in exchange for six Me 262s lost. He claimed two P-51Ds destroyed before suffering engine failure at high altitude. Then, while diving and trying to restart his engines, he was attacked by other Mustangs, forced to bail out, and died. The Kommando was then withdrawn for further flight training and a revision of combat tactics to optimise the Me 262's strengths.

On 26 November 1944, a Me 262A-2a Sturmvogel of III.Gruppe/KG 51 'Edelweiß' based at Rheine-Hopsten Air Base near Osnabrück was the first confirmed ground-to-air kill of a jet combat aircraft. The Me 262 was shot down by a Bofors gun of B.11 Detachment of 2875 Squadron RAF Regiment at the RAF forward airfield of Helmond, near Eindhoven. Others were lost to ground fire on 17 and 18 December when the same airfield was attacked at intervals by a total of 18 Me 262s and the guns of 2873 and 2875 Squadrons RAF Regiment damaged several, causing at least two to crash within a few miles of the airfield. In February 1945, a B.6 gun detachment of 2809 Squadron RAF Regiment shot down another Me 262 over the airfield of Volkel. The final appearance of Me 262s over Volkel was in 1945 when yet another fell to 2809's guns.

By January 1945, Jagdgeschwader 7 (JG 7) had been formed as a pure jet fighter wing, partly based at Parchim, although it was several weeks before it was operational. In the meantime, a bomber unit—I Gruppe, Kampfgeschwader 54 (KG(J) 54)—redesignated as such on 1 October 1944 through being re-equipped with, and trained to use the Me 262A-2a fighter-bomber for use in a ground-attack role. However, the unit lost 12 jets in action in two weeks for minimal returns. Jagdverband 44 (JV 44) was another Me 262 fighter unit, of squadron (Staffel) size given the low numbers of available personnel, formed in February 1945 by Lieutenant General Adolf Galland, who had recently been dismissed as Inspector of Fighters. Galland was able to draw into the unit many of the most experienced and decorated Luftwaffe fighter pilots from other units grounded by lack of fuel.

During March, Me 262 fighter units were able, for the first time, to mount large-scale attacks on Allied bomber formations. On 18 March 1945, thirty-seven Me 262s of JG 7 intercepted a force of 1,221 bombers and 632 escorting fighters. They shot down 12 bombers and one fighter for the loss of three Me 262s. Although a 4:1 ratio was exactly what the Luftwaffe would have needed to make an impact on the war, the absolute scale of their success was minor, as it represented only 1% of the attacking force.

In the last days of the conflict, Me 262s from JG 7 and other units were committed in ground assault missions, in an attempt to support German troops fighting Red Army forces. Just south of Berlin, halfway between Spremberg and the German capital, the Wehrmacht's 9th Army (with elements from the 12 Army and 4th Panzer Army) was assaulting the Red Army's 1st Ukrainian Front. To support this attack, on 24 April, JG 7 dispatched thirty-one Me 262s on a strafing mission in the Cottbus-Bautzen area. Luftwaffe pilots claimed six lorries and seven Soviet aircraft, but three German jets were lost. On the evening of 27 April, thirty-six Me 262s from JG 7, III.KG(J)6 and KJ(J)54 were sent against Soviet forces that were attacking German troops in the forests north-east of Baruth. They succeeded in strafing 65 Soviet lorries, after which the Me 262s intercepted low flying Il-2 Sturmoviks searching for German tanks. The jet pilots claimed six Sturmoviks for the loss of three Messerschmitts. During operations between 28 April and 1 May Soviet fighters and ground fire downed at least ten more Me 262s from JG 7.

However, JG 7 managed to keep its jets operational until the end of the war. And on 8 May, at around 4:00 p.m. Oblt. Fritz Stehle of 2./JG 7, while flying a Me 262 on the Erzgebirge, attacked a formation of Soviet aircraft. He claimed a Yakovlev Yak-9, but the plane shot down was probably a P-39 Airacobra. Soviet records show that they lost two Airacobras, one of them probably downed by Stehle, who would thus have scored the last Luftwaffe air victory of the war.

Several two-seat trainer variants of the Me 262, the Me 262 B-1a, had been adapted through the Umrüst-Bausatz 1 factory refit package as night fighters, complete with on-board FuG 218 Neptun high-VHF band radar, using Hirschgeweih ("stag's antlers") antennae with a set of dipole elements shorter than the Lichtenstein SN-2 had used, as the B-1a/U1 version. Serving with 10. Staffel Nachtjagdgeschwader 11, near Berlin, these few aircraft (alongside several single-seat examples) accounted for most of the 13 Mosquitoes lost over Berlin in the first three months of 1945. Intercepts were generally or entirely made using Wilde Sau methods, rather than AI radar-controlled interception. As the two-seat trainer was largely unavailable, many pilots made their first jet flight in a single-seater without an instructor.

Despite its deficiencies, the Me 262 clearly marked the beginning of the end of piston-engined aircraft as effective fighting machines.

The Me 262's top ace was probably Hauptmann Franz Schall with 17 kills, including six four-engine bombers and ten P-51 Mustang fighters, although fighter ace Oberleutnant Kurt Welter claimed 25 Mosquitos and two four-engine bombers shot down by night and two further Mosquitos by day. Most of Welter's claimed night kills were achieved by eye, even though Welter had tested a prototype Me 262 fitted with FuG 218 Neptun radar. Another candidate for top ace on the aircraft was Oberstleutnant Heinrich Bär, who is credited with 16 enemy aircraft while flying Me 262s out of his total of 240 aircraft shot down.

Anti-bomber tactics

The Me 262 was so fast that German pilots needed new tactics to attack Allied bombers. Even from astern, the closing speed was too great to use the short-ranged quartet of MK 108 cannon to maximum effect.

Gunners of Allied bomber aircraft found their electrically powered gun turrets had problems tracking the jets. Aiming was difficult because the jets closed into firing range quickly and remained in firing position only briefly, using their standard attack profile, which proved more effective.

A prominent Royal Navy test pilot, Captain Eric Brown, chief naval test pilot and commanding officer of the Captured Enemy Aircraft Flight Royal Aircraft Establishment, who tested the Me 262 noted that:

This was a Blitzkrieg aircraft. You whack in at your bomber. It was never meant to be a dogfighter, it was meant to be a destroyer of bombers... The great problem with it was it did not have dive brakes. For example, if you want to fight and destroy a B-17, you come in on a dive. The 30mm cannon were not so accurate beyond . Now, in two seconds, you can't sight. You can fire randomly and hope for the best. If you want to sight and fire, you need to double that time to four seconds. And with dive brakes, you could have done that.

Eventually, German pilots developed new tactics to counter Allied bombers. Me 262s, equipped with up to 24 unguided folding-fin R4M rockets—12 in each of two underwing racks, outboard of the engine nacelles—approached from the side of a bomber formation, where their silhouettes were widest and while still out of range of the bombers' machine guns, fired a salvo of rockets with strongly brisant Hexogen-filled warheads, the same explosive in the shells fired by the Me 262A's MK 108 cannon. One or two of these rockets could shoot down even the famously rugged Boeing B-17 Flying Fortress, from the "metal-shattering" brisant effect of the fast-flying rocket's  explosive warhead. The much bigger BR 21 large-calibre rockets, fired from their tubular launchers under the nose of the Me 262A (one either side of the nosewheel well) were only as fast as MK 108 rounds.

Though this broadside-attack tactic was effective, it came too late to have a real effect on the war and only small numbers of Me 262s were equipped with the rocket packs; most were Me 262A-1a models, of Jagdgeschwader 7. This method of attacking bombers became the standard and mass deployment of Ruhrstahl X-4 guided missiles was cancelled. Some nicknamed this tactic the Luftwaffe's Wolf Pack, as the fighters often made runs in groups of two or three, fired their rockets, then returned to base. On 1 September 1944, USAAF General Carl Spaatz expressed the fear that if greater numbers of German jets appeared, they could inflict losses heavy enough to force cancellation of the Allied bombing offensive by daylight.

Counter-jet tactics

The Me 262 was difficult to counter because its high speed and rate of climb made it hard to intercept. However, as with other turbojet engines at the time, the Me 262's engines did not provide sufficient thrust at low airspeeds and throttle response was slow, so that in certain circumstances such as takeoff and landing the aircraft became a vulnerable target. Another disadvantage that pioneering jet aircraft of the World War II era shared, was the high risk of compressor stall and if throttle movements were too rapid, the engine(s) could suffer a flameout. The coarse opening of the throttle would cause fuel surging and lead to excessive jet pipe temperatures. Pilots were instructed to operate the throttle gently and avoid quick changes. German engineers introduced an automatic throttle regulator later in the war but it only partly alleviated the problem.

The plane had, by contemporary standards, a high wing loading (294.0 kg/m2, 60.2 lbs/ft2) that required higher takeoff and landing speeds. Due to poor throttle response, the engines' tendency for airflow disruption that could cause the compressor to stall was ubiquitous. The high speed of the Me 262 also presented problems when engaging enemy aircraft, the high-speed convergence allowing Me 262 pilots little time to line up their targets or acquire the appropriate amount of deflection. This problem faces any aircraft that approaches another from behind at much higher speed, as the slower aircraft in front can always pull a tighter turn, forcing the faster aircraft to overshoot.

Luftwaffe pilots eventually learned how to handle the Me 262's higher speed and the Me 262 soon proved a formidable air superiority fighter, with pilots such as Franz Schall managing to shoot down seventeen enemy fighters in the Me 262, ten of them American P-51 Mustangs. Other notable Me 262 aces included Georg-Peter Eder, with twelve enemy fighters to his credit (including nine P-51s), Erich Rudorffer also with twelve enemy fighters to his credit, Walther Dahl with eleven (including three Lavochkin La-7s and six P-51s) and Heinz-Helmut Baudach with six (including one Spitfire and two P-51s) amongst many others.

Pilots soon learned that the Me 262 was quite maneuverable despite its high wing loading and lack of low-speed thrust, especially if attention was drawn to its effective maneuvering speeds. The controls were light and effective right up to the maximum permissible speed and perfectly harmonised. The inclusion of full span automatic leading-edge slats, something of a "tradition" on Messerschmitt fighters dating back to the original Bf 109's outer wing slots of a similar type, helped increase the overall lift produced by the wing by as much as 35% in tight turns or at low speeds, greatly improving the aircraft's turn performance as well as its landing and takeoff characteristics. As many pilots soon found out, the Me 262's clean design also meant that it, like all jets, held its speed in tight turns much better than conventional propeller-driven fighters, which was a great potential advantage in a dogfight as it meant better energy retention in manoeuvres.

Too fast to catch for the escorting Allied fighters, the Me 262s were almost impossible to head off. As a result, Me 262 pilots were relatively safe from the Allied fighters, as long as they did not allow themselves to get drawn into low-speed turning contests and saved their maneuvering for higher speeds. Combating the Allied fighters could be effectively done the same way as the U.S. fighters fought the more nimble, but slower, Japanese fighters in the Pacific.

Allied pilots soon found that the only reliable way to destroy the jets, as with the even faster Me 163B Komet rocket fighters, was to attack them on the ground or during takeoff or landing. Luftwaffe airfields identified as jet bases were frequently bombed by medium bombers, and Allied fighters patrolled over the fields to attack jets trying to land. The Luftwaffe countered by installing extensive Flak alleys of anti-aircraft guns along the approach lines to protect the Me 262s from the ground—and by providing top cover during the jets' takeoff and landing with the most advanced Luftwaffe single-engined fighters, the Focke-Wulf Fw 190D and (just becoming available in 1945) Focke-Wulf Ta 152H. Nevertheless, in March–April 1945, Allied fighter patrol patterns over Me 262 airfields resulted in numerous jet losses.

As the Me 262A's pioneering Junkers Jumo 004 axial-flow jet engines needed careful nursing by their pilots, these jet aircraft were particularly vulnerable during takeoff and landing. Lt. Chuck Yeager of the 357th Fighter Group was one of the first American pilots to shoot down an Me 262, which he caught during its landing approach. On 7 October 1944, Lt. Urban Drew of the 365th Fighter Group shot down two Me 262s that were taking off, while on the same day Lt. Col. Hubert Zemke, who had transferred to the Mustang equipped 479th Fighter Group, shot down what he thought was a Bf 109, only to have his gun camera film reveal that it may have been an Me 262. On 25 February 1945, Mustangs of the 55th Fighter Group surprised an entire Staffel of Me 262As at takeoff and destroyed six jets.

The British Hawker Tempest scored several kills against the new German jets, including the Me 262. Hubert Lange, a Me 262 pilot, said: "the Messerschmitt Me 262's most dangerous opponent was the British Hawker Tempest—extremely fast at low altitudes, highly manoeuvrable and heavily armed." Some were destroyed with a tactic known to the Tempest-equipped No. 135 Wing RAF as the "Rat Scramble": Tempests on immediate alert took off when an Me 262 was reported airborne. They did not intercept the jet, but instead flew towards the Me 262 and Ar 234 base at Hopsten air base. The aim was to attack jets on their landing approach, when they were at their most vulnerable, travelling slowly, with flaps down and incapable of rapid acceleration. The German response was the construction of a "flak lane" of over 150 emplacements of the 20 mm Flakvierling quadruple autocannon batteries at Rheine-Hopsten to protect the approaches. After seven Tempests were lost to flak at Hopsten in a week, the "Rat Scramble" was discontinued.

High-speed research

Adolf Busemann had proposed swept wings as early as 1935; Messerschmitt researched the topic from 1940. In April 1941, Busemann proposed fitting a 35° swept wing (Pfeilflügel II, literally "arrow wing II") to the Me 262, the same wing-sweep angle later used on both the American F-86 Sabre and Soviet Mikoyan-Gurevich MiG-15 fighter jets. Though this was not implemented, he continued with the projected HG II and HG III (Hochgeschwindigkeit, "high-speed") derivatives in 1944, designed with a 35° and 45° wing sweep, respectively.

Interest in high-speed flight, which led him to initiate work on swept wings starting in 1940, is evident from the advanced developments Messerschmitt had on his drawing board in 1944. While the Me 262 V9 Hochgeschwindigkeit I (HG I) flight-tested in 1944 had only small changes compared to combat aircraft, most notably a low-profile canopy—tried as the Rennkabine (literally "racing cabin") on the ninth Me 262 prototype for a short time—to reduce drag, the HG II and HG III designs were far more radical. The projected HG II combined the low-drag canopy with a 35° wing sweep and a V-tail (butterfly tail). The HG III had a conventional tail, but a 45° wing sweep and turbines embedded in the wing roots.

Messerschmitt also conducted a series of flight tests with the series production Me 262. Dive tests determined that the Me 262 went out of control in a dive at Mach 0.86, and that higher Mach numbers would cause a nose-down trim that the pilot could not counter. The resulting steepening of the dive would lead to even higher speeds and the airframe would disintegrate from excessive negative g loads.

Messerschmitt believed the HG series of Me 262 derivatives was capable of reaching transonic Mach numbers in level flight, with the top speed of the HG III being projected as Mach 0.96 at  altitude. After the war, the Royal Aircraft Establishment, at that time one of the leading institutions in high-speed research, re-tested the Me 262 to help with British attempts at exceeding Mach 1. The RAE achieved speeds of up to Mach 0.84 and confirmed the results from the Messerschmitt dive-tests. The Soviets ran similar tests.

After Willy Messerschmitt's death in 1978, the former Me 262 pilot Hans Guido Mutke claimed to have exceeded Mach 1 on 9 April 1945 in a Me 262 in a "straight-down" 90° dive. This claim relies solely on Mutke's memory of the incident, which recalls effects other Me 262 pilots observed below the speed of sound at high indicated airspeed, but with no altitude reading required to determine the speed. The pitot tube used to measure airspeed in aircraft can give falsely elevated readings as the pressure builds up inside the tube at high speeds. The Me 262 wing had only a slight sweep, incorporated for trim (center of gravity) reasons and likely would have suffered structural failure due to divergence at high transonic speeds.

Production

About 1,400 planes were produced, however, less than a hundred Me 262s were in a combat-ready condition at any one time. According to sources they destroyed from 300 to 450 enemy planes, with the Allies destroying about one hundred Me 262s in the air. While Germany was bombed intensively, production of the Me 262 was dispersed into low-profile production facilities, sometimes little more than clearings in the forests of Germany and occupied countries. From the end of February to the end of March 1945, approximately sixty Me 262s were destroyed in attacks on Obertraubling and thirty at Leipheim; the Neuburg jet plant itself was bombed on 19 March 1945.

Large, heavily protected underground factories were constructed – as with the partly-buried Weingut I complex for Jumo 004 jet engine production – to take up production of the Me 262, safe from bomb attacks. A disused mine complex under the Walpersberg mountain was adapted for the production of complete aircraft. These were hauled to the flat top of the hill where a runway had been cleared and flown out. Between 20 and 30 Me 262s were built here, the underground factory being overrun by Allied troops before it could reach a meaningful output. Wings were produced in Germany's oldest motorway tunnel at Engelberg, to the west of Stuttgart. At B8 Bergkristall-Esche II, a vast network of tunnels was excavated beneath St. Georgen/Gusen, Austria, where slave labourers of concentration camp Gusen II produced fully equipped fuselages for the Me 262 at a monthly rate of 450 units on large assembly lines from early 1945. Gusen II was known as one of the harshest concentration camps; the typical life expectancy was six months. An estimated 35,000 to 50,000 people died on the forced labour details for the Me 262.

Postwar history

After the end of the war, the Me 262 and other advanced German technologies were quickly swept up by the Soviets, British and Americans, as part of the USAAF's Operation Lusty. Many Me 262s were found in readily repairable condition and were confiscated. The Soviets, British and Americans wished to evaluate the technology, particularly the engines.

During testing, the Me 262 was found to be faster than the British Gloster Meteor jet fighter, and had better visibility to the sides and rear (mostly due to the canopy frames and the discoloration caused by the plastics used in the Meteor's construction), and was a superior gun platform to the Meteor F.1 which had a tendency to snake at high speed and exhibited "weak" aileron response. The Me 262 had a shorter range than the Meteor and had less reliable engines.

Captain Eric Brown,an RAF test pilot who had flew 487 types of planes during his service, flew a captured ME 262 (as well as other German WW2 Jets) after the end of the war. He referred to the ME 262 as "the most formidable aircraft of WW2." He noted that it had a number of innovatory features, but in terms of performance, was a quantum jump ahead of other planes at the time. In particular he noted its swept back wings, its axial flow jet engine, and the four powerful 30mm cannons. He stated that it was significantly faster than the fastest Spitfire (at the time) and with that speed "you could conduct combat totally on your own terms. If you didn't want to engage, you could go off and leave everyone standing."

The USAAF compared the Lockheed P-80 Shooting Star and Me 262, concluding that the Me 262 was superior in acceleration and speed, with similar climb performance. The Me 262 appeared to have a higher critical Mach number than any American fighter.

The Americans also tested a Me 262A-1a/U3 unarmed photo reconnaissance version, which was fitted with a fighter nose and a smooth finish. Between May and August 1946, the aircraft completed eight flights, lasting four hours and forty minutes. Testing was discontinued after four engine changes were required during the course of the tests, culminating in two single-engine landings. These aircraft were extensively studied, aiding development of early US, British and Soviet jet fighters. The F-86, designed by engineer Edgar Schmued, used a slat design based on the Me 262's.

The Czechoslovak aircraft industry continued to produce single-seat (Avia S-92) and two-seat (Avia CS-92) variants of the Me 262 after World War II. From August 1946, a total of nine S-92s and three two-seater CS-92s were completed and test flown. They were introduced in 1947 and in 1950 were supplied to the 5th Fighter Squadron, becoming the first jet fighters to serve in the Czechoslovak Air Force. These were kept flying until 1951, when they were replaced in service by Soviet jet fighters. Both versions are on display at the Prague Aviation museum in Kbely.

Flyable reproductions

In January 2003, the American Me 262 Project, based in Everett, Washington, completed flight testing to allow the delivery of partially updated spec reproductions of several versions of the Me 262 including at least two B-1c two-seater variants, one A-1c single-seater and two "convertibles" that could be switched between the A-1c and B-1c configurations. All are powered by General Electric CJ610 engines and feature additional safety features, such as upgraded brakes and strengthened landing gear. The "c" suffix refers to the new CJ610 powerplant and has been informally assigned with the approval of the Messerschmitt Foundation in Germany (the Werknummer of the reproductions picked up where the last wartime produced Me 262 left off – a continuous airframe serial number run with a near 60-year production break).

Flight testing of the first newly manufactured Me 262 A-1c (single-seat) variant (Werknummer 501244) was completed in August 2005. The first of these machines (Werknummer 501241) went to a private owner in the southwestern United States, while the second (Werknummer 501244) was delivered to the Messerschmitt Foundation at Manching, Germany. This aircraft conducted a private test flight in late April 2006 and made its public debut in May at the ILA 2006. The new Me 262 flew during the public flight demonstrations. Me 262 Werknummer 501241 was delivered to the Collings Foundation as White 1 of JG 7; this aircraft offered ride-along flights starting in 2008. The third replica, a non-flyable Me 262 A-1c, was delivered to the Evergreen Aviation & Space Museum in May 2010.

Variants

Note:- U = Umrüst-Bausatz – conversion kit installed at factory level, denoted as a suffix in the form /Un.
 Me 262 A-0
 Pre-production aircraft fitted with two Jumo 004B turbojet engines, 23 built.
 Me 262 A-1a "Schwalbe"
 Primary production version, usable as both fighter (interceptor) and fighter-bomber.
 Me 262 A-1a/U1
 Single prototype with a total of six nose mounted guns, two  MG 151/20 cannon, two  MK 103 cannon, and two  MK 108 cannon.
 Me 262 A-1a/U2
 Single prototype with FuG 220 Lichtenstein SN-2 90 MHz radar transceiver and Hirschgeweih (stag's antlers) antenna array, for trials as a night-fighter.
 Me 262 A-1a/U3
 Reconnaissance version modified in small numbers, with Rb 20/30 cameras mounted in the nose or alternatively one Rb 20/20 and one Rb 75/30 (Rb – Reihenbildner – series-picture, topographic camera). Some retained one  MK 108 cannon, but most were unarmed.
 Me 262 A-1a/U4
 Bomber destroyer version, two prototypes with an adapted  MK 214 (intended armament) or BK 5 (test ordnance only) anti-tank gun in the nose.
 Me 262 A-1a/U5
 Heavy jet fighter with six  MK 108 cannon in the nose.
 Me 262 A-1b
 Trio of A-1a evaluation versions, starting with Werknummer 170 078, re-engined with two BMW 003A turbojets in place of the Jumo 004s, maximum speed .
 Me 262 A-2a "Sturmvogel"
 Definitive bomber version retaining only the two lower  MK 108 cannon.
 Me 262 A-2a/U1
 Single prototype with advanced bombsight.
 Me 262 A-2a/U2
 Two prototypes with glazed nose for accommodating a bombardier.
 Me 262 A-3a
 Proposed ground-attack version.
 Me 262 A-4a
 Reconnaissance version.
 Me 262 A-5a
 Definitive reconnaissance version used in small numbers at end of the war.
 Me 262 B-1a
 Two-seat trainer.
 Me 262 B-1a/U1
 Me 262 B-1a trainers converted into provisional night fighters, FuG 218 Neptun radar, with Hirschgeweih (eng:antler) eight-dipole antenna array.
 Me 262 B-2
 Proposed night fighter version with stretched fuselage.
 Me 262C
 Proposed development prototypes in four differing designs, meant to augment or replace the Jumo 004 jets with liquid-fueled rocket propulsion, as the "Home Protector" (Heimatschützer) series.
 Me 262 C-1a
 Single prototype [made from Me 262A Werknummer 130 186] of rocket-boosted interceptor (Heimatschützer I) with Walter HWK 109-509 liquid-fuelled rocket in the tail, first flown with combined jet/rocket power on 27 February 1945.
 Me 262 C-2b
 Single prototype [made from Me 262A Werknummer 170 074] of rocket-boosted interceptor (Heimatschützer II) with two BMW 003R "combined" powerplants (BMW 003 turbojet, with a single  thrust BMW 109-718 liquid-fuelled rocket engine mounted atop the rear of each jet exhaust) for boosted thrust, only flown once with combined jet/rocket power on 26 March 1945.
Me 262 C-3
 Heimatschützer III – proposed version with Jumo 004 turbojet engines replaced with Walter HWK RII-211 Liquid-fuelled rocket engines.
 Me 262 C-3a
 Heimatschützer IV - a rocket-boosted interceptor with a Walter HWK 109-509S-2 rocket motor housed in a permanent belly pack. Prototypes and initial production aircraft were captured before completion.
 Me 262 D-1
 Proposed variant to carry Jagdfaust mortars.
 Me 262 E-1
 Proposed variant based on A-1a/U4 with a  MK 114 cannon.
 Me 262 E-2
 Proposed rocket-armed variant carrying up to 48 × R4M rockets.
 Me 262 HG-I
 "High Speed" variant, modified A-1a with new "racing" style cockpit and additional pieces were added to wing roots at the front.
 Me 262 HG-II
 Second "High Speed" variant, more heavily modified A-1a with "racing" style cockpit and wings swept at 35-degree angle and engine nacelles were moved closer to fuselage. A new butterfly V-shaped tail was tested but was too unstable in wind tunnel tests, so normal tail was kept.
 Me 262 HG-III
 Proposed Third "High Speed" variant, only progressed to wind tunnel model stage. This was the last and the pinnacle of the Me 262 aerodynamical possibility, which would have been built from the ground up as a new Me 262 instead of modifying older ones. In the Me 262 HG-III, its wings were swept at 45 degrees, it also had the "racing" style cockpit, but the largest change was the moving of the engine nacelles right into the fuselage side and changing the engines to the more powerful Heinkel HeS 011 engines.
 Me 262 S
 Zero-series model for Me 262 A-1a
 Me 262 W-1
 Provisional designation for Me 262 with 2x  Argus As 014 pulse jet engines
 Me 262 W-3
 Provisional designation for Me 262 with 2x  "square-intake" Argus As 044 pulse jet engines
 Me 262 Lorin
 Provisional designation for Me 262 with 2x Lorin ramjet booster engines in "over-wing" mounts, one above each of the Jumo turbojet nacelles.

Rüstsätze (field modification kits)
Rüstsatze may be applied to various sub-types of their respective aircraft type, denoted as a suffix in the form /Rn.
Data from: Messerschmitt Me 262A Schwalbe
/R1: Underfuselage pylon for  external fuel tank.
/R2: Ratog installation for two Rheinmetall 109-502 solid rocket engines.
/R3: BMW 003R rocket boosted turbojet installation.
/R4: Installation of the FuG 350 Zc Naxos radar warning receiver / detector.
/R5: The standard 4x  MK 108 cannon installation.
/R6: Jabo (JagdBomber) equipment, such as bombsights and bomb racks.
/R7: Underwing installation of 12x R4M rockets carried on wooden racks.
/R8: R110BS Air to air rocket installation.
/R9: Ruhrstahl Ru 344 X-4 air-to-air missile installation.

Postwar variants
 Avia S-92
 Czech-built Me 262 A-1a (fighter)
 Avia CS-92
 Czech-built Me 262 B-1a (fighter trainer, two seats)

Reproductions
A series of reproductions was constructed by American company Legend Flyers (later Me 262 Project) of Everett, Washington. The Jumo 004 engines of the original are replaced by more reliable General Electric CJ610 engines. The first Me 262 reproduction (a two-seater) took off for the first time in December 2002 and the second one in August 2005. This one was delivered to the Messerschmitt Foundation and was presented at the ILA airshow in 2006.

A-1c: American privately built, based on A-1a configuration.
B-1c: American privately built, based on B-1a configuration.
A/B-1c: American privately built, convertible between A-1c and B-1c configuration.

Operators
  Luftwaffe
  Czechoslovak Air Force (postwar, nine S-92 and three CS-92)

Surviving aircraft

 Me 262 A-1a/R7, W.Nr.500071 White 3, III./JG 7
 Deutsches Museum, Munich, Germany. This aircraft, flown by Hans Guido Mutke while a pilot of 9. Staffel/JG 7, was confiscated by Swiss authorities on 25 April 1945 after Mutke made an emergency landing in Switzerland due to lack of fuel (80 litres were remaining, 35 litres were usually burnt in one minute).
 Me 262 A-1a
 Reconstructed from parts of crashed and incomplete Me 262s. Luftwaffenmuseum der Bundeswehr, Germany.
 Me 262 A-1a W.Nr.501232 Yellow 5, 3./KG(J)6
 National Museum of the United States Air Force, Wright-Patterson Air Force Base, Dayton, Ohio, US.
 Me 262 A-1a/U3 W.Nr.500453
 Flying Heritage Collection, Everett, Washington, United States, currently undergoing restoration to flying condition. It is intended to fly using its original Jumo 004 engines. The aircraft was bought from the Planes of Fame Air Museum, Chino, California.
 Me 262 A-1a/R7 W.Nr.500491 Yellow 7, II./JG 7
 National Air and Space Museum, Smithsonian Institution, Washington, D.C., United States. Possesses twin original underwing racks for 24 R4M unguided rockets. Flown by Oberfeldwebel Heinz Arnold
 Me 262 A-1a W.Nr.112372
 Royal Air Force Museum Cosford RAF Cosford, Cosford, United Kingdom.
 Me 262 A-2a W.Nr.500200 Black X 9K+XK, 2 Staffel./KG 51
 Australian War Memorial, Canberra, Australia. Built at Regensburg in March 1945, same batch from which the Deutsches Museum White 3 was built. Flown by Fahnenjunker Oberfeldwebel Fröhlich and surrendered at Fassberg. It remains the only Me 262 left in existence wearing original (albeit worn, as seen in the picture) colours. Its markings show both the Unit signatures along with the Air Ministry colours applied at Farnborough, where it was allocated reference Air Min 81. Restoration was completed in 1985 and the aircraft was put up on display. The Australian War Memorial's website states that the aircraft "is the only Me 262 bomber variant to survive, and is the only remaining Me 262 wearing its original paint".
 Me 262 B-1a/U1, W.Nr.110305 Red 8
 South African National Museum of Military History, Johannesburg, South Africa.
 Me 262 B-1a, W.Nr.110639 White 35
 National Museum of Naval Aviation, Pensacola, Florida (previously at NAS/JRB Willow Grove, Willow Grove, Pennsylvania, US)
 Avia S-92
 Prague Aviation Museum, Kbely, Prague, Czech Republic.
 Avia CS-92
 Prague Aviation Museum, Kbely, Prague, Czech Republic.

Specifications (Messerschmitt Me 262 A-1a)

Notable appearances in media

See also

References

Notes

Citations

Bibliography

Further reading

External links
 Gun camera footage of US 8th Airforce engagements against Me-262s

 
Aircraft first flown in 1942
S-092
Cruciform tail aircraft
German inventions of the Nazi period
Low-wing aircraft
Mauthausen concentration camp
Me 262
1940s German fighter aircraft
Twinjets
World War II jet aircraft of Germany